Hungerford Township is a township in Plymouth County, Iowa in the United States. The township is named after.

The elevation of Hungerford Township is listed as 1234 feet above mean sea level.

References

Townships in Iowa